Tricia Marie "Shaznay" Lewis (born 14 October 1975) is an English singer, songwriter and a member of the girl group All Saints. She has co-written most of the group's songs, including number one singles: "Bootie Call", "Pure Shores" and international hit single "Never Ever".

Lewis launched a solo career in 2004 with her debut solo album, Open, and singles "Never Felt Like This Before" and "You". She has written for other artists such as Stooshe, co-writing their Brit Award nominated hit single "Black Heart" and Little Mix, co-writing their hit single "How Ya Doin'?"

Career

1993–2001: All Saints 
At a party, Lewis was introduced by friends to Ben Volpeliere-Pierrot of Curiosity Killed the Cat, who took her to the Metamorphosis recording studios on All Saints Road, London, where she started doing backing vocals. It was at the Metamorphosis recording studios where she met Melanie Blatt in 1993 and they proceeded to record together. Together with Simone Rainford they formed the group All Saints 1.9.7.5., which was later renamed All Saints. Soon after,  Rainford left the group and Nicole and Natalie Appleton joined.

In 1997, All Saints experienced international success with BRIT Award-winning single "Never Ever", which is co-written by Lewis and topped the charts in the United Kingdom and Australia. The single sold over 1.2 million copies in the United Kingdom, being certified double platinum by the British Phonographic Industry. The same year, the group released their debut album All Saints. Most of the songs were co-written by Lewis and the album reached number two in the United Kingdom. It was eventually certified platinum five times for sales of 1.5 million copies. In 2000 the group released their fourth number one single "Pure Shores", written by Lewis and William Orbit; the single was certified platinum by the BPI for sales of 600,000 copies. The group released their fifth number one single "Black Coffee", which was certified silver for sales of 200,000 copies.

In early 2001, All Saints broke up and Lewis began work on her solo career. The same year she won the Ivor Novello Award for best songwriting.

2002–2004: Open 
In 2004, it was reported that Lewis would release her debut solo single "Never Felt Like This Before" on 5 July, which would precede her untitled debut solo album on which she'd worked with numerous writers and producers including: Basement Jaxx, Biz Markie, K-Gee, Bacon and Quarmby and Trevor Jackson. The single reached no. 8 in the United Kingdom. On 19 July she released her debut album Open, and it reached no. 22 in the United Kingdom. Later that year she released new single "You", which peaked at no. 56 in the United Kingdom.

Lewis has also appeared in several films including a role as Mel in the BAFTA and Golden Globe nominated Bend It Like Beckham (2002). She also played a role in Hideous Man (2002). On 14 November 2004 Lewis was involved in the Band Aid 20 re-recording of "Do They Know It's Christmas".

2006–2007: All Saints reunion 

On 24 January 2006, it was announced that All Saints had reformed with a new recording contract and would release a new album, Studio 1 on 13 November 2006. She performed with All Saints on live television for the first time since reforming on the British light entertainment program Ant & Dec's Saturday Night Takeaway on 21 October 2006. All Saints' comeback began well, with their single, "Rock Steady", reaching no. 3 in the UK Singles Chart. They followed this with the release of their comeback album Studio 1. It peaked at no. 40 in the UK Albums Chart. Parlophone Records then released their second single "Chick Fit", but this failed to reach the chart. All Saints then parted company with their record label.

2008–2013: Songwriting career 
In January 2008, Lewis featured on the Wideboys track, "Daddy-O". The single was released on 5 May 2008 and peaked at No. 32 in the UK. As a songwriter, Lewis is credited in Westlife's track "Reach Out", which was featured on their 2009 album Where We Are, the CocknBullKid track "Distractions" from her 2011 album Adulthood and the Stooshe single "Black Heart", released as a single in 2012. In August 2012, it was reported Lewis was in the studio with original Sugababes line-up Mutya Keisha Siobhan, writing new material for their debut album. In 2019 Shaznay co-wrote the theme music for the Netflix original series Turn Up Charlie with Idris Elba

2014–present: Second All Saints reunion 
In 2014, All Saints reformed to support the Backstreet Boys for five dates across the UK and Ireland in 2014. On 27 January 2016, it was confirmed that All Saints will release their fourth studio album Red Flag on 8 April 2016. The lead single from the album, "One Strike", preceded the album on 26 February 2016.  All Saints more recently released the 2018 album Testament saw the band reunite with producer William Orbit  and was preceded by the singles Love Lasts Forever and After All. Both albums were written by Lewis and a string of collaborators including Fred Ball, Invisible Men, Futurecut & many more.  To support both album releases, All Saints embarked on two UK tours, headlined festivals across the world and appeared as special guests on Take That's Wonderland Live arena and stadium tour.

Personal life 
Lewis was born in Islington to a Barbadian father and a Jamaican mother.

Despite growing up in a Spurs supporting household, Lewis made three appearances for Arsenal L.F.C. when she was a teenager.
On 21 August 2004, Lewis married dancer Christian "Storm" Horsfall. They had their first child, a son named Tyler-Xaine, in February 2006. In November 2009, Lewis and her husband had their second child, a daughter named Tigerlily.

Discography 

Open (2004)

Filmography

References

External links 
 
 

1975 births
English people of Barbadian descent
English people of Jamaican descent
All Saints (group) members
English songwriters
21st-century Black British women singers
British contemporary R&B singers
Black British women rappers
Ivor Novello Award winners
People from Islington (district)
Rappers from London
Footballers from Greater London
English women's footballers
Arsenal W.F.C. players
Women's association footballers not categorized by position
Living people
English women pop singers
English soul singers
Feminist musicians